Frédérique Jossinet (born 16 December 1975 in Rosny-sous-Bois) is a French Olympic judoka in the lightest (less than 48 kg) class.

Awards

Olympic games
2004 Olympic games in Athens, Greece:
 Silver medal in the -48 kg class.

World Judo Championships
2003 World Judo Championships in Osaka, Japan:
 Silver medal in the -48 kg class.
2005 World Judo Championships in Cairo, Egypt:
 Silver medal in the -48 kg class.
2007 World Judo Championships in Rio de Janeiro, Brazil:
 Bronze medal in the -48 kg class.
2009 World Judo Championships in Rotterdam, Netherlands:
 Bronze medal in the -48 kg class.

European Judo Championships

Other
Team:
  Gold medal at the world championships team in 2006.
  Gold medal at the European Championships team in 1997 and 1996.
Club:
 European Club Cup in 2000
Tournoi de Paris :
 10 podium finishes including 3 wins.

References

External links

 
 
 

Living people
1975 births
French female judoka
Olympic judoka of France
Judoka at the 2004 Summer Olympics
Olympic silver medalists for France
Olympic medalists in judo
Judoka at the 2008 Summer Olympics
Medalists at the 2004 Summer Olympics
Universiade medalists in judo
Mediterranean Games gold medalists for France
Mediterranean Games medalists in judo
Competitors at the 1997 Mediterranean Games
Universiade bronze medalists for France
Medalists at the 1999 Summer Universiade
20th-century French women
21st-century French women